The Saint Kitts and Nevis Division 1 is the 2nd tier of football in Saint Kitts and Nevis. Teams in The Saint Kitts and Nevis Division 1 compete for promotion to the Saint Kitts and Nevis Premier Division.

Teams for the 2018-2019 season:

Football leagues in Saint Kitts and Nevis
Second level football leagues in the Caribbean